Untitled Film Stills is a series of black and white photographs by American visual artist Cindy Sherman predominantly made between 1977 and 1980, which gained her international recognition. Sherman casts herself in various stereotypical female roles inspired by 1950's and 1960's films. They represent clichés or feminine types "that are deeply embedded in the cultural imagination." It was later sponsored by Madonna at the Museum of Modern Art (MoMA) in 1997.

Details
Cindy Sherman poses in various stereotypical female roles inspired by 1950's and 1960's Hollywood, Film noir, B movies, and European art-house films. They represent clichés or feminine types (the office girl, bombshell, girl on the run, housewife, and so on) "that are deeply embedded in the cultural imagination." The characters in all of these photographs are always looking away from the camera and outside of the frame. Sherman casts herself in each of these roles, becoming both the artist and subject in the work.

The art historian Rosalind Krauss described the series as “copies without originals”. All of the images are untitled, as Sherman wanted to preserve their ambiguity. The numbers affiliated with individual works of art are assigned by her gallery, mainly as a cataloguing system. In December 1995, the Museum of Modern Art (MOMA) acquired all sixty-nine black-and-white photographs in the series. Sherman later decided to add one more image, bringing the series to seventy. In past exhibitions at MOMA, the photographs are neither hung chronologically, nor grouped according to theme, locale, or content. Modest in scale compared to Sherman's later cibachrome photographs, they are all 8½ × 11 inches, each displayed in identical, simple black frames. The glossy finish and scale are meant to reference publicity or promotion stills for a movie.

In the essay The Making of Untitled, Sherman reflects on her beginnings with this series:I suppose unconsciously, or semiconsciously at best, I was wrestling with some sort of turmoil of my own about understanding women. The characters weren't dummies; they weren't just airhead actresses. They were women struggling with something but I didn't know what. The clothes make them seem a certain way, but then you look at their expression, however slight it may be, and wonder if maybe "they" are not what the clothes are communicating. I wasn't working with a raised "awareness," but I definitely felt that the characters are questioning something-perhaps being forced into a certain role. At the same time, those roles are in film: the women aren't being lifelike, they're acting. There are so many levels of artifice. I like that whole jumble of ambiguity.

Art curator Eva Respini stated that this is “arguably one of the most significant bodies of work made in the twentieth century and thoroughly canonized by art historians, curators, and critics.”

A selection of 21 photographs of the series was sold by Christie's for $6,773,000 on 11 November 2014.

See also
 List of photographs considered the most important

References

Feminist works
Black-and-white photographs
1977 works
1977 in art
1978 in art
1979 in art
1980 in art
1970s photographs
1980s photographs
Photographs by Cindy Sherman